"Don't Look Back" is a 1965 song recorded by The Temptations for the Gordy (Motown) label. The flip side to their Top 20 hit "My Baby", "Don't Look Back" broke out and became a hit among the R&B audience on its own, reaching #14 on the R&B charts.

Considered one of original lead singer Paul Williams' showcases, "Don't Look Back" was regularly employed as the closing number for Temptations live performances. Although the original flip side, "My Baby", was initially more popular with pop audiences at the time, over the decades, "Don't Look Back" has proven to be the far more popular and enduring tune. It was also performed by the group on The Ed Sullivan Show. There are no known cover versions of "My Baby".

Background
Written by Miracles members Smokey Robinson and Ronald White, the authors of the No. 1 Temptations hit "My Girl", "Don't Look Back" is a reassurance to the tentative that finding true love is worth the heartbreak and failed relationships it takes to reach it. As the song's narrator, Paul Williams, promises his lover, in his trademark gritty tone:
If you just put your hand in mine
We're gonna leave all your troubles behind
keep on walkin' and don't look back.

Smokey Robinson, the song's producer, specifically assigned Paul Williams to sing lead on the song. Although Williams had been the group's original lead singer during its formative years, his role had by 1965 been eclipsed by David Ruffin and Eddie Kendricks, who had both sung lead on Temptations hit singles. As such, Williams was often overlooked for leads, even on album tracks and B-sides, prompting him to complain, "shit, y'know, I can sing too!"

"Don't Look Back" was originally this single's A-side, but was passed over by the nation's DJs in favor of the Ruffin-led "My Baby", which had a much bigger pop success than this song, and placed on the B-side. The song nevertheless was promoted as if it were an A-side and would be the only B-side to chart on the Billboard Hot 100 for the group (but missed the Top 40 as it peaked at #83).

Although the song's relatively modest initial chart success prevented Paul Williams from getting any more leads on Temptations singles releases, the fact is that "Don't Look Back" became a huge belated hit, because his dynamic performance of the song on the Temptations Live! LP received huge airplay by R&B DeeJays nationwide, and propelled sales of the album into the Top 10 of the Billboard pop album chart.  Both sides of the single would receive a second pressing and the tracks remixed, with the following statements added on: "Taken from the album #G 914 The Temptin' Temptations." With the second printing, the sides were reversed, making "My Baby" the A-side, while "Don't Look Back", the original A-side, was relegated to B-side status.

Cash Box described the song as a "catchy, rhythmic ode about a twosome who seem aptly suited to each other."

"Don't Look Back" was more often performed at Temptations live shows than "My Baby". On the 1967 Temptations Live! album, the women in the audience can be heard demanding that the group perform the song, which they proceeded to do. Paul Williams, who developed many of The Temptations' dance steps, developed a routine for the live shows that had him following the song's advice to "keep on walkin'" and performing a strut across the stage, to the delight of the audience. As befitting an intended "A" side, "Don't Look Back" was conceived by Motown Records as an elaborate and dynamic closing number for the Temptations.

As Paul Williams' specialty number, "Don't Look Back" was retired from The Temptations' repertoire after Williams, suffering from complications of sickle-cell disease and alcoholism, left the group in 1971. The group performed the song at their induction to the Rock and Roll Hall of Fame as a tribute to Williams, along with Daryl Hall and John Oates, who announced the induction.

Credits and personnel
 Lead vocals by Paul Williams
 Background vocals by Eddie Kendricks, Melvin Franklin, David Ruffin, and Otis Williams
 Written by  William "Smokey" Robinson and Ronald White
Produced by Smokey Robinson
 Instrumentation by The Funk Brothers.

Chart history

Notable cover versions

Peter Tosh and Mick Jagger version 

Peter Tosh scored a minor hit in 1978 with a reggae version of the song, sharing vocals with Mick Jagger. That version bore the modified title "(You Gotta Walk And) Don't Look Back". The song hit #1 in the Netherlands and #20 in Australia, and #81 in the US.

The track appears also on Peter Tosh 1978 album Bush Doctor with credited Mick Jagger vocals. The pair played the song together that year on an episode of Saturday Night Live and a couple of times during Tosh's opening performance on the Rolling Stones US Tour 1978. The Rolling Stones rehearsed it for that tour and played it once in Chicago 2002.

Tosh had previously recorded the song with The Wailers in ska style in 1966.

Dirk De Smet version 

Dirk De Smet, the winner of the second series of the Belgian edition of X Factor musical competition made a remake of the song under the title "Walk and Don't Look Back" being his debut release after the win. It reached #4 on the Flemish Ultratop Belgian Singles Chart in 2008.

Other cover versions
The song inspired many other cover versions including: 
David Lindley on his 1981 album El Rayo-X. 
Phil Collins recorded a version during the sessions for his 2010 album Going Back.
Al Green
Bobby Womack
The Persuasions
Teena Marie
Sugababes
Keith & Tex

References

Bibliography
 Williams, Otis and Romanowski, Patricia (1988, updated 2002). Temptations. Lanham, MD: Cooper Square. .
 Williams, Otis and Weigner, Harry (2002). My Girl: The Very Best of the Temptations (Compact disc liner notes). New York: Motown/Universal Records.

External links
"Don't Look Back" - Original Studio Version
"Don't Look Back" - Live Version

1965 singles
1979 singles
The Temptations songs
Teena Marie songs
Motown singles
Songs written by Smokey Robinson
Songs written by Ronald White
Song recordings produced by Smokey Robinson